Yan Tan Tethera is a chamber opera (subtitled A Mechanical Pastoral) by the English composer Harrison Birtwistle with a libretto by the poet Tony Harrison, based on a supernatural folk tale about two shepherds, their sheep, and the Devil. It was first performed at Queen Elizabeth Hall, London, on 7 August 1986. The title comes from a traditional way of counting sheep.

Roles

References
Holden, Amanda (Ed.), The New Penguin Opera Guide, New York: Penguin Putnam, 2001. 
Universal Edition details
YouTube: Yan Tan Tethera - Harrison Birtwistle

Bibliography
Adlington, Robert (2000): The Music of Harrison Birtwistle, Cambridge University Press. 
Beard, David (2012): Harrison Birtwistle's Operas and Music Theatre, Cambridge University Press. 
Cross, Jonathan (2000): Harrison Birtwistle: Man, Mind Music, Faber. 
Hall, Michael (1984): Harrison Birtwistle, Robson. 

Operas
Operas by Harrison Birtwistle
English-language operas
1986 operas